Wendy Holden (born 1961), also known as Taylor Holden, is an author, journalist and former war correspondent who has written more than thirty books. She was born in Pinner, North London and now lives in Suffolk, England.

Her bestselling title is Born Survivors: Three Young Mothers and their extraordinary story of courage, defiance and survival, a Goodreads finalist, published in over 20 countries. She is the ghostwriter of Captain Tom Moore's autobiography, Tomorrow Will Be A Good Day, published by Penguin Books on 17 September 2020. An audiobook edition is read by Sir Derek Jacobi.

Publications

Novels

The Sense of Paper: A Novel of Obsessions, about a former war correspondent running from the ghosts of her past, was published by Random House, New York in 2006 and as an e-book in 2013;
Mr Scraps, 2013, a novella published as an ebook.
The Cruelty of Beauty, about a female glassmaker in pre-revolution Czechoslovakia - published by Mlada Fronta in 2019 and as an ebook in English the same year.
The novelisation of the film The Full Monty, which became an international bestseller in nine languages.

Non-fiction titles
Her first book, Unlawful Carnal Knowledge, about the controversial Irish abortion case, was banned across Ireland;
10 Mindful Minutes: Giving Our Children and Ourselves the Social and Emotional Skills to Reduce Stress and Anxiety for Healthier, Happier Lives with Goldie Hawn, 2011, an international bestseller;
Born Survivors: Three Young Mothers and Their Extraordinary Story of Courage, Defiance and Hope, published in 2015.
Uggie, The Artist: My Story, 2012, a canine memoir published in five countries.
Shell Shock: The Psychological Trauma of War, which accompanied a four-part television documentary for Channel 4.
Shrink: The Diet for the Mind by Philippe Tahon

BiographiesTomorrow Will Be A Good Day, 2020,  memoir of Captain Sir Tom Moore, a number one Sunday Times bestsellerCaptain Tom's Life Lessons, 2021, by Captain Sir Tom Moore.A Woman of Firsts: The true story of a midwife who built a hospital and changed the world, 2019, by Edna And Ismail, a BBC Radio 4 Book of the Week.In the Name of Gucci, 2016, by Patricia Gucci published in eight languages.Lady Blue Eyes, 2011, a memoir of Frank Sinatra's widow Barbara, a New York Times bestseller;A Lotus Grows in the Mud, 2005, the autobiography of Goldie Hawn, a New York Times bestseller;Memories Are Made of This, 2004, a biography of Dean Martin as seen by his daughter, held by 1,083 libraries according to WorldCat; Behind Enemy Lines: the true story of a French Jewish spy in Nazi Germany, 2002, the autobiography of Marthe Cohn;Tomorrow to Be Brave, 2001, an autobiography of Susan Travers, the only woman in the French Foreign Legion during WWII; Till the Sun Grows Cold, a mother's account of her daughter's life and death in war-torn Sudan;Heaven and Hell: My Life in the Eagles (1974–2001), the autobiography of Don Felder, former lead guitarist of the Eagles;Kill Switch, an account of a former British soldier wrongly jailed in Afghanistan;Central 822, her autobiography of Carol Bristow, one of Scotland Yard’s first ever female detectives, was serialised globally on BBC Radio.Footprints in the Snow, the story of a paraplegic, was made into a television film starring Caroline Quentin and Kevin Whately;Haatchi & Little B, the tale of a boy with Schwartz–Jampel syndrome and his three-legged dog published in twelve countries in 2014;
 One Hundred Miracles: A Memoir of Music and Survival'', an autobiography of Zuzana Růžičková, Holocaust survivor and world-famous harpsichordist, 2019, published in nine languages.

References

External links
Wendy Holden's official website

1961 births
Living people
People from Pinner
Ghostwriters
English women journalists
Pseudonymous women writers
English women novelists
English women non-fiction writers
Writers from London
Journalists from London
21st-century English novelists
21st-century British non-fiction writers
21st-century biographers
20th-century British journalists
21st-century British journalists
20th-century English women writers
20th-century English writers
21st-century English women writers
20th-century pseudonymous writers
21st-century pseudonymous writers